Epitonium novangliae, common name the New England wentletrap,  is a species of small ectoparasitic sea snail, a marine gastropod mollusk in the family Epitoniidae, the wentletraps.

Distribution
This snail is found in shallow water in the North West Atlantic Ocean, the Gulf of Mexico and the Caribbean Sea.

Description 
The maximum recorded shell length is 20 mm.

Habitat 
Minimum recorded depth is 0 m. Maximum recorded depth is 457 m.

References

External links

Epitoniidae
Molluscs of the Atlantic Ocean
Gastropods described in 1838